May Creek is a creek located in the Boundary Country of British Columbia.  The creek is a tributary of July Creek.  May Creek flows into July Creek about five miles west of Grand Forks, British Columbia.  The creek has been mined for gold.

References

External links
 

Rivers of British Columbia